Letters to Ali is a 2004 documentary film about the story of an asylum seeker, a family and a filmmaker.

The movie pictures the hardship of the asylum seekers, and pays attention to the fact that Australia remains the only western country that keep children in detention centres.

Awards

References

Documentary films about refugees in Australia
Australian documentary films
2004 documentary films
2004 films
Films directed by Clara Law
2000s English-language films